In aerospace engineering, payload fraction is a common term used to characterize the efficiency of a particular design. Payload fraction is calculated by dividing the weight of the payload by the takeoff weight of aircraft. Fuel represents a considerable amount of the overall takeoff weight, and for shorter trips it is quite common to load less fuel in order to carry a lighter load. For this reason the useful load fraction calculates a similar number, but based on the combined weight of the payload and fuel together.

Propeller-driven airliners had useful load fractions on the order of 25–35%. Modern jet airliners have considerably higher useful load fractions, on the order of 45–55%.

For spacecraft the payload fraction is often less than 1%, while the useful load fraction is perhaps 90%. In this case the useful load fraction is not a useful term, because spacecraft typically cannot reach orbit without a full fuel load. For this reason the related term  propellant mass fraction, is used instead. However, if the latter is large, the payload can only be small.

Examples

Note: the above table may incorrectly include the mass of the empty upper stage or stages.

See also
 Tsiolkovsky rocket equation

References

Astrodynamics
Aerospace engineering